Deltarune is a role-playing video game actively being developed by Toby Fox. The player controls a teenage human, Kris, who is destined to save the world together with Susie, a monster, and Ralsei, a prince from the Dark World. During their quest to seal the "Dark Fountains" prophesied to end the world, the group meets the inhabitants of the "Dark World", some of whom try to stop them. The combat system is based on bullet hell attacks the player must dodge. Similar to Undertale, enemy encounters can be resolved peacefully or through violence. 

Development of Deltarune began in 2012, three years before Fox's previous game Undertale was released. Though it shares some narrative elements with Undertale, it takes place in a different setting. Deltarune'''s battle system was overhauled to more closely resemble the combat of the Final Fantasy series. The first chapter of the game was released for free on October 31, 2018, for macOS and Windows; the Nintendo Switch and PlayStation 4 editions were released on February 28, 2019. The second chapter was eventually released for free on the same platforms in September 2021. More chapters are planned as a paid release, but no release date has been announced yet. The game was generally praised by critics for its soundtrack, characters, and sense of humor.

Gameplay

Like Undertale, Deltarune is a role-playing game with a top-down perspective. The player directly controls a human named Kris, but selects actions for other characters in the game during battle. Similarly to Undertale, Deltarune includes puzzles and bullet hell sections in which the player must move a heart around a boxed area while avoiding attacks. Undertales random encounter system has been removed; players can now see the enemies in the environment before they encounter them, allowing for the possibility of avoiding (or deliberately engaging) them.

The game utilizes a turn-based combat system. Players can choose from a set of actions each turn such as fight, act, spare, use an item, or defend, which reduces incoming damage. Brushing against attacks without touching them, defending, and hitting an enemy increases the tension points (TP) gauge, which allow party members to use spells or particular acts. For example, Ralsei can pacify enemies by singing them to sleep. When a party member's hit points (HP) reaches 0, they become downed and will not be able to fight until revived. The HP of downed party members will regenerate slowly until it reaches 1; any other healing source will also revive a downed party member.

While the game often encourages the player to avoid fights and spare monsters, this is made difficult during some of the first chapter: Susie, who is not initially controlled by the player, will attack enemies rather than spare them, and thus the player must also warn enemies of Susie's attacks if they want to show mercy.

PlotDeltarunes narrative spans seven chapters, of which two have been released with five more being planned for a later release over the years. Although it features some characters and elements from Undertale, it takes place in a different setting.

Chapter 1 – The Beginning
The game begins with the player being prompted to create an avatar, but the "vessel" is ultimately discarded, as "no one can choose who they are in this world". Instead, the player is given control of the human teenager Kris, who arrives late to school one morning. After being paired up with their delinquent monster classmate Susie for a group project, their teacher, Alphys, sends the two to get chalk from the supply closet. However, the closet pulls them into a strange realm—the Dark World—where they meet the dark prince Ralsei. He tells them that the three are heroes destined to close the geyser-like Dark Fountains that give form to the Dark Worlds, in order to preserve the balance between light and dark. A new Dark Fountain has created a new Dark World east of Ralsei's, guarded by a dark creature called King. Susie, uninterested in Ralsei's story, initially joins King's son Lancer in trying to stop Kris and Ralsei, but both are convinced to change sides and join the party.

Lancer refuses to confront his father and does not want his new friends to be hurt, so he imprisons them in King's dungeon. Susie helps Kris and Ralsei escape and fights Lancer, but ultimately reconciles with him and promises not to hurt King. Kris, Susie, and Ralsei confront and battle King, after which he falls over in exhaustion. Ralsei heals him out of pity, but once healed King incapacitates the group and prepares to kill them. If the player has not violently subdued any prior enemies, Lancer leads the Dark World's inhabitants in overthrowing and imprisoning King; otherwise, Susie distracts King long enough for Ralsei to cast a Pacify Spell on him, thus putting him into deep slumber. After battling King, Kris closes the Dark Fountain, revealing that Dark Worlds are ordinary rooms transformed, and returns home. That night, Kris rises from their bed, rips out their soul, throws it into a bird cage, and draws a knife.

Chapter 2 – A Cyber's World
The next morning, Toriel wakes up to discover Kris has eaten a whole pie, comically resolving the cliffhanger in which the previous chapter ended. After school, Kris and Susie return to the Dark World and reunite with Ralsei. At his instance, they return to the room where they emerged after closing the Dark Fountain the day before and pick up the items inside. Upon carrying them back to the closet, the Dark World's Castle Town expands to contain explorable buildings and becomes inhabited by previously encountered Darkners, including Lancer and an imprisoned King.

Ralsei urges the two to leave and work on their group project with their classmates Noelle and Berdly. Kris and Susie head to the library's computer lab, but discover a new Dark World has been created inside it, and Noelle and Berdly have both been sucked in. The Dark World's ruler, a robot named Queen, kidnaps Noelle, intending to use her to create new Dark Fountains. Berdly, out of admiration for both Noelle and Queen, helps the latter with her plans. Ralsei travels to the new Dark World to help Kris and Susie against Queen.

Kris is temporarily separated from Susie and Ralsei and joins up with Noelle, helping her evade Queen. During this section, Kris encounters Spamton, a spambot. Through an optional sidequest, Kris can later help Spamton enter the basement of Queen's mansion and upgrade himself into the superboss Spamton NEO.

Kris and Susie convince Berdly to change sides, but he is captured by Queen. After Berdly is freed, Queen reveals that any inhabitant of the light world can open a Dark Fountain through the use of "Determination" and attacks with a giant robot. Queen defeats the group and threatens to kill them if Noelle does not follow her plans, but Noelle finally stands up to and refuses to obey Queen. Realizing the error of her ways, Queen tells Noelle to choose the world she wants, and only create the new world if she wishes to. Berdly then attempts to create a Dark Fountain, but Ralsei tells him to stop, warning that opening too many Fountains will cause a cataclysmic event known as "The Roaring". Kris closes the new Dark Fountain, and Queen and her followers relocate to Ralsei's Dark World.

Kris and Susie awaken in the computer lab with Noelle and Berdly, who believe that their adventure was a dream. Susie walks Kris back home and is invited in by Kris's mother Toriel. In the bathroom, Kris tears out their soul again and climbs out a window. After Kris returns and puts their soul back in their body, Toriel discovers that her car's tires have been slashed, calls the police, and suggests that Susie spend the night. After Toriel and Susie have fallen asleep, Kris rips out their soul again, turns on the living room TV, and uses their knife to open what appears to be a Dark Fountain in the living room. The screen fades to black, and a smile appears on the static of the TV screen.

Alternate route
If the player forces Noelle to freeze enemies with ice magic, an alternate story route (commonly referred to as the "Weird", "SnowGrave", or "Genocide" route) occurs. The player emotionally manipulates Noelle to freeze enemies and solve puzzles by herself, and makes a deal with Spamton to acquire a ring that improves her magic. She is eventually forced to freeze Berdly solid with the SnowGrave spell after he confronts the duo. She then leaves Kris, shaken by her own actions. Noelle is too exhausted to participate in Queen's plans, and Ralsei informs the latter of the Roaring preemptively, avoiding her battle. Kris goes to seal the Fountain alone, but is stopped by Spamton, who entered the basement while Queen was distracted looking for Berdly and upgraded himself into Spamton NEO. Fighting Spamton, Kris calls for help from Susie and Ralsei, who do not respond. The player then calls for help from Noelle, who arrives and freezes Spamton before Kris seals the fountain. In the light world, Berdly is found unresponsive in the computer lab, and Noelle questions whether the Dark World really was a dream after she notices Kris has her watch. The route ends the same way as the normal route, with Kris opening a Dark Fountain in their living room.

Development and release
The idea for Deltarune came to Toby Fox in a dream he had in 2011 while he was at college. In the dream, he saw the ending to a video game and was determined to create it. Fox was also inspired by a collection of playing card designs posted on Tumblr by artist Kanotynes. Development of the game started in 2012, although it was abandoned before Fox created the first room. Some music from the original project was recycled for Undertale, most notably the main battle theme (which became Papyrus' battle theme, "Bonetrousle"), and a song called "Joker Battle" (which was reused for the Toriel fight as "Heartache"). Various factors such as the graphics, an overhauled combat system, and Fox's mental state made Deltarune a more challenging game to produce than Undertale.

Temmie Chang, who previously assisted Fox with character art in Undertale, served as the main artist for Deltarune. She helped design characters, sprites and animations. Fox came up with Susie's design after playing Phoenix Wright: Ace Attorney. He originally based her on Maya Fey and she would act "nice and cute". However, as her design progressed, she eventually turned into more of a "thug". Fox stated that he planned to give an unnamed character a fire spell which they would not be good at using, but decided against adding it in the first chapter.Deltarune was developed by Fox in GameMaker Studio 2. The game introduces a new battle system comparable to the one used in the Final Fantasy franchise, contrasting with the Undertales combat system (which shared similarities with that of the Mother series). While some of the game's music is completely new, it also incorporates portions of the Undertale soundtrack. Unlike Undertale, Fox has stated that Deltarune is planned to have only one ending.

After previously teasing something Undertale-related a day earlier, Fox released the first chapter of Deltarune for free on October 31, 2018. Initially disguised as a "survey program", it is described as a game "intended for people who have completed Undertale". As he envisioned a larger project than Undertale, he said that he needed to form a team to release the full game, which would be sold as a single package. In November 2018, Deltarune merchandise was announced on in collaboration with Fangamer, including T-shirts, a poster, plushies, pin sets, keychains, and the Deltarune, Chapter 1 soundtrack on CD and vinyl.

A Nintendo Direct released on February 13, 2019, announced that the first chapter of Deltarune would be released on Nintendo Switch on February 28. On February 21, 2019, the official PlayStation Twitter account announced that a PlayStation 4 version of the first chapter would also be released on February 28. The Switch and PlayStation 4 versions were developed and published by 8-4.

Development of the second chapter began in March 2019. In addition to further designing the game's story and characters, Fox spent much time experimenting with game engines other than GameMaker Studio 2. He eventually concluded that GameMaker "still felt like the best fit for the project", and using the first chapter as a base, he began working in May 2020, with Fox and Chang joined by a few other team members. Fox has stated that Chapter 2 may actually be the game's largest due to it having the most cutscenes, the chapter's use of a large amount of characters, and other factors. In the 2020 update, Fox said he is considering expanding his 4-people team, following wrist and hand pain which has slowed down production on the game, and since then Fox said he received over 1000 applications. During a livestream celebrating the 6th anniversary of Undertale on September 15, 2021, Fox announced that the second chapter would release on PC and Mac via Steam and itch.io two days later on September 17, 2021, as another free release. The Switch and PS4 versions were updated to include Chapter 2 on September 23, in conjunction with that day's Nintendo Direct. In his blog, Fox stated the second chapter was also released for free as the COVID-19 pandemic made the world "really tough for everybody recently". Fox also revealed that the game's third, fourth, and fifth chapters would be released as a single paid title once completed; the game's menus currently depict a total of seven planned chapters. Chapters 3, 4 and 5 are currently being developed, with no release date announced.

Reception
Chapter 1

The first chapter of Deltarune garnered many comparisons to Undertale. Jason Schreier of Kotaku and Dominic Tarason of Rock, Paper, Shotgun compared it favorably. Schreier praised the refinements of Undertales elements, calling it "a refreshing return"; Tarason agreed, saying that Deltarune is "a higher-budget production". Although Mitchell Parton of Nintendo World Report thought that Deltarune "doesn't significantly change up the formula", he did not have a problem with it. Nintendo Lifes Mitch Vogel was less positive, being disappointed that after how "fresh" Undertale was at its release, Deltarune ended up being just' more of the same".

A significant amount of praise was aimed at the music, with Schreier claiming that "The soundtrack should be enough of a selling point." Tarason found that the music had "a fresh new edge to it" whereas Parton described it as "emotional and solid" and expressed surprise at it being composed by one person. Adam Luhrs of RPGFan praised Fox's "clever use of motifs", feeling that they were incorporated well in Deltarunes story. GameSpot Michael Higham pointed out similarities between Deltarune and Undertales music, believing that they're "callbacks to remind you that these two worlds are somehow bound together".

Video game music group Materia Collective released the official 40-track soundtrack, composed by Toby Fox, and featuring composer-songwriter Laura Shigihara on the best-selling single "Don't Forget". Fangamer released a 1-LP vinyl record on July 11, 2019.

Tarason liked the game's pixel art, calling it "more detailed and expressive" compared to Undertale, a sentiment which Parton agreed with. Higham further elaborated that Deltarunes ability to "communicate so much with so little" is one of its greatest strengths and that the "character expressions and body language provide vivid displays of personality". The gameplay was also generally well received, with Parton calling it "unique" and Vogel describing the combat as "an organic and well-implemented expansion of the original". Some criticism was given by Higham, referring to some sequences—such as the Card Castle—as "a bit barebones".

Allegra Frank of Polygon mentioned that Deltarunes sense of humor is one of its "defining features". Vogel concurred, calling the humor "witty" and the story "compelling". Higham stated that "you'll be smiling ear-to-ear from the witty writing, snappy jokes, and absurdist humor". Parton and Tarason focused more on the character designs, with Tarason praising the "fresh (and lovable) set of characters" and Parton asserting that their designs range from "undeniably adorable to nightmarishly disturbing".

Vogel was critical of the way that the Dark World was implemented, opining that despite it looking slightly better than Undertale, it "hardly feels like a cohesive or living place". He also criticized the "sparsely decorated hallways with very little in the way of interesting design or presentation", ending his criticism by saying that "Deltarune is unfortunately not a very pretty game to look at." Parton also listed the game's infrequent save points as a negative in his summary.

Chapter 2ScreenRant rated the second chapter 4.5 out of 5, saying that "the quality of the experience matches that of a full-price game, and it makes the wait for the next chapters even harder", describing it in comparison to the first chapter as "[feeling] like a game that's more  confidant  in its direction, and more willing to let players shape the fate of its characters". Ana Diaz of Polygon described Chapter 2's world as "welcoming" despite being a "harsh challenge", praising its humor and noting that it "complicates the moral and ethical questions posed by the game's predecessor, Undertale, while adding to the story started in Chapter 1".

Mary Clarke of For The Win mentioned that the "Weird Route" had changed the way she thought about video games, saying "the most chilling and upsetting part of the Snowgrave Route is what the text is saying about us as players of video games".

After the release of Chapter 2, the demo (which contains Chapters 1 and 2) attracted around 100,000 concurrent players on Steam, far higher than Undertale''s lifetime record.

Awards
Chapter 1's soundtrack was nominated for the Game Audio Network Guild / MAGFest People's Choice Award at the 2019 G.A.N.G. Awards.

Notes

References

External links
 

2018 video games
Undertale
Indie video games
Puzzle video games
Role-playing video games
Science fantasy video games
Metafictional video games
Bullet hell video games
Video games about animals
LGBT-related video games
Retro-style video games
Single-player video games
Video games scored by Toby Fox
Video games scored by Laura Shigihara
Video games scored by Lena Raine
GameMaker Studio games
Video games developed in the United States
Nintendo Switch games
PlayStation 4 games
PlayStation Network games
MacOS games
Windows games